The 2012 Morocco Tennis Tour – Marrakech was a professional tennis tournament played on hard courts. It was the sixth edition of the tournament which was part of the 2012 ATP Challenger Tour. It took place in Marrakech, Morocco between 19 and 25 March 2012.

Singles main-draw entrants

Seeds

 1 Rankings are as of March 12, 2012.

Other entrants
The following players received wildcards into the singles main draw:
  Anas Fattar
  Yassine Idmbarek
  Paul-Henri Mathieu
  Mehdi Ziadi

The following players received entry from the qualifying draw:
  Nikoloz Basilashvili
  Victor Crivoi
  Norbert Gombos
  Bastian Knittel

Champions

Singles

 Martin Kližan def.  Adrian Ungur, 3–6, 6–3, 6–0

Doubles

 Martin Kližan /  Daniel Muñoz de la Nava def.  Iñigo Cervantes Huegun /  Federico Delbonis, 6–3, 1–6, [12–10]

External links
Official Website
ITF Search
ATP official site

2012
Marrakech